Aldo Andrés Florentín Britez (born 10 November 1957) is a Paraguayan former football attacking midfielder born in Caazapá.

Honours

 Cerro Porteño
 Paraguayan Primera División: 1977, 1987, 1992
 Sol de América
 Paraguayan Primera División: 1986, 1991

Titles

References

External links
 .

1957 births
Living people
Paraguayan footballers
Paraguay international footballers
Copa América-winning players
1979 Copa América players
Cerro Porteño players
Association football midfielders